A by-election was held for the New South Wales Legislative Assembly electorate of Sydney-Fitzroy on 3 June 1898 because of the death of John McElhone.

Dates

Result

John McElhone died.

See also
Electoral results for the district of Sydney-Fitzroy
List of New South Wales state by-elections

Notes

References

1898 elections in Australia
New South Wales state by-elections
1890s in New South Wales